Armidale Airport  is an airport serving Armidale, a city in the Australian state of New South Wales. The airport is operated by Armidale Regional Council.

Facilities 

Airlines and destinations

Previous airlines
A Tamworth–Armidale–Brisbane route was served by QantasLink until 2002, when the service was taken over by MacAir Airlines until January 2003, after which time it was operated by Sunshine Express Airlines before the company ceased scheduled flying in 2006. Brindabella Airlines commenced Armidale-Brisbane flights in August 2011 using Metro III turboprop aircraft; however, this service was discontinued in June 2012. The decision to withdraw from Armidale and Albury made national headlines as it was widely reported the airline's reasons included an expected increase in operating costs due to the implementation of the controversial Carbon pricing scheme by the Gillard Government set to become effective the following month.

Airport upgrade
The Armidale Regional Council has a number of upgrades to the airport currently in progress, with much of the funding for the works promised by Member for New England Barnaby Joyce during the 2013 Australian federal election campaign. Previously the council had unsuccessfully submitted a proposal to the Regional Development Australia Fund in 2012 for $2.45 million in funding to allow upgrades to the airport terminal, security screening and apron areas, as well as resurfacing the runway, construction of a parallel taxiway and upgrading the airport's lighting. When complete the works will increase capacity, allowing the airport to handle 70 seat aircraft such as the Bombardier Q400 operated by QantasLink and potentially attract new airlines such as Virgin Australia, operating ATR 72 type aircraft through its regional subsidiaries.

Statistics 
Armidale Airport was ranked 45th in Australia for the number of revenue passengers served in financial year 2012–2013.

See also 
 List of the busiest airports in Australia
 List of airports in New South Wales

References

External links 

 Armidale by Air – info and images of Armidale Airport

Airports in New South Wales
Armidale